Truck art in South Asia is a popular form of regional decoration, with trucks featuring elaborate floral patterns and calligraphy. It is especially common in Pakistan and India.

During the War in Afghanistan, Pakistani decorated trucks that ran services between Pakistan and Afghanistan came to be known as jingle trucks by American troops and contractors who were deployed across the latter country.

"Jingle truck" origin
The term "jingle truck" is military slang that was coined by American troops serving in Afghanistan, although it may also date back to the British colonial period. The term came to be because of the jingling sound that the trucks make due to the chains and pendants hanging from the bumpers of the vehicles.

Practice

Many trucks and buses are highly customized and decorated by their owners. External truck decoration can cost thousands of dollars. The decoration often contains elements that remind the truck drivers of home, since they may be away from home for months at a time. The art is a mode of expression for the truck drivers. Decoration may include structural changes, paintings, calligraphy and ornamental-decor like mirror work on the front and back of vehicles and wooden carvings on the truck doors. Depictions of various historical scenes and poetic verses are also common. Outfitting is often completed at a coach workshop.  Chains and pendants often dangle off the front bumper. In India, motifs depicting eagles, kites, cow nuzzling calf and nazar battu, and catchphrases like "Horn OK Please", "Blow Horn" and "Use Dipper at Night" are frequently seen. Religious iconography, poetry and political logos are also common.

Artists
One of the most prominent truck artists is Haider Ali. Trained by his father from his youth, he first came to international attention in 2002 when he painted a Pakistani truck as part of the Smithsonian Folklife Festival. Nafees Ahmad Khan, a truck art artist in Indore, is well known throughout India and has been designing one truck every day for over thirty-two years. Mr. Syed Phool Badshah, also known as Phool ji, is a well known truck artist who is best known for his unique style of doing Fine Arts with Truck art.

Regional styles

In Pakistan, Karachi is a major city centre for truck art, though there are other hubs in Rawalpindi, Swat, Peshawar, Quetta and Lahore. Trucks from Balochistan and Peshawar are often heavily trimmed with wood, while trucks from Rawalpindi and Islamabad often feature plastic work. Camel bone ornamentation and predominance of red colours is commonly seen on trucks decorated in Sindh.

In India, the Delhi-based artist Tilak Raj Dhir states that the slogans he adds to his truck art, which is prevalent throughout the National Capital Region, often change with the socio-political atmosphere. The state of Punjab is considered a major centre of truck art in India, with a distinctive style and expert artists. Poetry is commonly seen in truck art across northern India, and particularly in Uttar Pradesh. Truck art in Hindi and Urdu is sometimes called Phool Patti.

Influence

Truck art has extended beyond the decoration and ornamentation of trucks into other forms and media.

Cars
Though cars are not traditionally decorated in South Asia, there are examples of cars embellished in a truck art style. In 2009, The Foxy Shahzadi, a 1974 VW Beetle decorated in a truck art style, travelled from Pakistan to France in a 25-day journey. In the Indian city of Mumbai, some drivers decorate their taxis in a truck art style.

Fashion
The lively colours of Pakistani trucks have inspired some fashion designers. The Italian fashion company Dolce & Gabbana used truck art-inspired displays in a 2015 campaign. Although used more often on women's fashion, some men's clothing have been inspired by South Asian truck art. Apart from clothing, truck art has also been incorporated into shoes by some.

Print Design
Farid Bawa, an Indian graphic designer, collaborates with Indian truck artists to make and sell prints of truck art online in a bid to preserve the tradition of truck art.

Gallery

See also
 Karachi to Melbourne Tram
 Dekotora
 Tap tap

References

External links

 Pictures of decorated Pakistani trucks
 In Pictures: The Colourful and Magnificent Truck Art of India by Tanaya Singh
 Horn Please (Documentary)
 Flickr photos
 More Flickr photos
 US Military blog, nice photos
 CNN site

South Asia
Road transport in Pakistan
Customised buses
Folk art
Decorated vehicles
Decorative arts
Pakistani art
Pakistani handicrafts
Indian art
Road transport in Afghanistan
Road transport in India
Truck art in Pakistan